Uy-Salgan (Üy-Salgan) is a rural locality (a selo) in Oratyubinsky Selsoviet, Nogaysky District, Republic of Dagestan, Russia. The population was 332 as of 2010. There are 7 streets. Selo was founded in 1914.

Geography 
It is located 57 km west from Terekli-Mekteb.

Nationalities 
Nogais live there.

References 

Rural localities in Nogaysky District, Dagestan